Picramnia xalapensis is a plant species native to the State of Veracruz, Mexico. Type locale is in the mountains near the City of Xalapa.

Picramnia xalapensis is a shrub to small tree. Leaves are evergreen, thick, leathery, pinnately compound, lacking stipules. Leaves are numerous, ovate to lanceolate, gradually tapering at the tip.

References

Picramniales
Flora of Veracruz
Endemic flora of Mexico